= Baashe Delta =

Singer-songwriter

- Born: 10 May 2002 (age 24)
- Origin: Somalia
- Genres: Acoustic; pop; indie; electronic
- Occupations: Singer; songwriter; guitarist; composer; producer
- Instruments: Vocals; guitar; piano; bass; keyboard
- Years active: 2018–present
- Website: baashedelta.com

Baashe Delta (born 10 May 2002) is a Somali–German singer and songwriter. In 2019, he secured a record deal with Kkurbo Studio. Delta is best known for his popular tune "Najma", a semi-R&B/pop song that became a national anthem and topped numerous African music charts.

== Awards and nominations ==
• 2021 Somali Music Awards – Best Music Video, Germany
